Krasnykh (from красный meaning red) is a gender-neutral Russian surname. It may refer to
Aleksandr Krasnykh (born 1995), Russian swimmer

References

Russian-language surnames